Kent is a provincial electoral district for the Legislative Assembly of New Brunswick, Canada.  It was created for the 1995 election, taking in most of Kent Centre and parts of Kent North. Its boundaries were expanded southward in 2006, while losing some territory to its north.

It was represented from its creation until 2013 by members of the Graham family. Senior Liberal cabinet minister and incumbent from Kent Centre Alan Graham was elected here in 1995.  His son Shawn Graham, succeeded him in a 1998 by-election and was re-elected in the 1999, 2003, 2006 and 2010 general elections.  The younger Graham served as Premier of New Brunswick from 2006-2010 and resigned in 2013 after the provincial conflict commissioner ruled he had violated the Members' Conflict of Interest Act in approving loan guarantees to a company with which Alan was associated.

Members of the Legislative Assembly

Election results

References

External links 
Website of the Legislative Assembly of New Brunswick
Map of Kent riding (2010)

Former provincial electoral districts of New Brunswick